Moult is a former commune in the Calvados department in the Normandy region in northwestern France. On 1 January 2017, it was merged into the new commune Moult-Chicheboville. The commune is situated about 16 kilometers southeast of Caen. It is in the valley of the Muance.

History 
The ancient ruins in and around the commune suggest that it was used as a fortified camp that controlled the area between Vieux and Lisieux.

Population

See also
Communes of the Calvados department

References

External links

Official site

Former communes of Calvados (department)
Calvados communes articles needing translation from French Wikipedia